The 1999 Open Gaz de France was a women's tennis tournament played on indoor hardcourts at the Stade Pierre de Coubertin in Paris in France that was part of Tier II of the 1999 WTA Tour. It was the seventh edition of the tournament and was held from 22 February until 28 February 1999. Unseeded Serena Williams won the singles title and earned $80,000 first-prize money. It was her first WTA singles title. On the same day her sister Venus won the IGA Superthrift Tennis Classic tournament, making them the first sisters to win WTA events in the same week.

Finals

Singles

 Serena Williams defeated  Amélie Mauresmo, 6–2, 3–6, 7–6(7–4)
 It was Williams' 1st singles title of her career.

Doubles

 Irina Spîrlea /  Caroline Vis defeated  Elena Likhovtseva /  Ai Sugiyama, 7–5, 3–6, 6–3

Entrants

Seeds

Other entrants
The following players received wildcards into the singles main draw:
  Émilie Loit
  Sabine Appelmans
  Amélie Cocheteux

The following players received wildcards into the doubles main draw:
  Amélie Cocheteux /  Nathalie Dechy

The following players received entry from the singles qualifying draw:
  Sandra Načuk
  Karina Habšudová
  Anne-Gaëlle Sidot
  Åsa Carlsson

The following players received entry as lucky losers:
  Laurence Andretto
  Sandra Kleinová
  Laurence Courtois

The following players received entry from the doubles qualifying draw:
  Eleni Daniilidou /  Sandra Načuk

References

External links
 ITF tournament edition details
 Tournament draws

Open Gaz de France
Open GDF Suez
Open Gaz de France
Open Gaz de France
Open Gaz de France
Open Gaz de France